Charles Simons (27 September 1906 in Antwerp, Belgium – 5 August 1979) was a Belgian footballer.

Career 
Playing as a midfielder at Royal Antwerp FC, Charles Simons was Belgian champion in 1929 and 1931. He also played 10 times for the Diables Rouges in 1931 and 1932.

Honours 
 Belgian international in 1931 and 1932 (10 caps)
 Picked for the 1934 World Cup (did not play)
 Belgian Champions in 1929 and 1931 with Royal Antwerp FC

References

External links
 

Belgium international footballers
Royal Antwerp F.C. players
1906 births
Footballers from Antwerp
1979 deaths
Belgian footballers
1934 FIFA World Cup players
Belgian Pro League players
Association football midfielders